The Lake George Patrol Cabin was built in 1934 by the National Park Service in Mount Rainier National Park as a backcountry patrol station and hiker's shelter. Initially intended as a horse barn, it was converted for ranger accommodation, replacing a 1921 structure. The first cabin survived until 1969, when it was destroyed by a falling tree.

The cabin was listed on the National Register of Historic Places on March 13, 1991. It is part of the Mount Rainier National Historic Landmark District, which encompasses the entire park and which recognizes the park's inventory of Park Service-designed rustic architecture.

References

Park buildings and structures on the National Register of Historic Places in Washington (state)
Houses completed in 1921
Buildings and structures in Pierce County, Washington
Ranger stations in Mount Rainier National Park
Log cabins in the United States
National Register of Historic Places in Mount Rainier National Park
Log buildings and structures on the National Register of Historic Places in Washington (state)
1921 establishments in Washington (state)